The 2018–19 CAA men's basketball season marked the 34th season of Colonial Athletic Association basketball, taking place between November 2018 and March 2019.  Practices commenced in October 2018, and the season ended with the 2019 CAA men's basketball tournament.

Head coaches

Coaching changes 
There were no coaching changes following the 2017–18 season.

Coaches 

Notes:
 All records, appearances, titles, etc. are from time with current school only.
 Year at school includes 2018–19 season.
 Overall and CAA records are from time at current school and are through the end of the 2017–18 season.

Preseason

Preseason poll 
Source

() first place votes

Preseason All-Conference Teams 
Source

Colonial Athletic Association Preseason Player of the Year: Justin Wright-Foreman (Hofstra)

Regular season

Rankings

Conference matrix 
This table summarizes the head-to-head results between teams in conference play.

Postseason

Colonial Athletic Association tournament

NCAA tournament 

The CAA had one bid to the 2019 NCAA Division I men's basketball tournament, that being the automatic bid of Northeastern by winning the conference tournament.

National Invitation tournament 

Hofstra received an automatic bid to the 2019 National Invitation Tournament by winning as regular season conference champions.

College Basketball Invitational

CollegeInsider.com Postseason tournament

Awards and honors

Regular season

CAA Player-of-the-Week

 Nov. 12 – Grant Riller (Charleston)
 Nov. 19 – Justin Wright-Foreman (Hofstra)
 Nov. 26 – Grant Riller (Charleston)(2), Justin Wright-Foreman (Hofstra)(2)
 Dec. 3  – Eric Carter (Delaware)
 Dec. 10 – Justin Wright-Foreman (Hofstra)(3)
 Dec. 17 – Jarrell Brantley (Charleston), Brian Fobbs (Towson)
 Dec. 24 – Jarrell Brantley (Charleston)(2)
 Dec. 31 – Justin Wright-Foreman (Hofstra)(4)
 Jan. 7  – Justin Wright-Foreman (Hofstra)(5)
 Jan. 14 – Darius Banks (James Madison), Devontae Cacok (UNCW)
 Jan. 21 – Eli Pemberton (Hofstra), Vasa Pusica (Northeastern)
 Jan. 28 – Justin Wright-Foreman (Hofstra)(6)
 Feb. 4  – Vasa Pusica (Northeastern)(2)
 Feb. 11 – Justin Wright-Foreman (Hofstra)(7)
 Feb. 18 – Nathan Knight (William & Mary), Grant Riller (Charleston)(3)
 Feb. 25 – Matt Lewis (James Madison)
 Mar.  4 – Steven Santa Ana (Elon)

CAA Rookie-of-the-Week

 Nov. 12 – L.J. Owens (William & Mary)
 Nov. 19 – Camren Wynter (Drexel)
 Nov. 26 – Chase Audige (William & Mary)
 Dec. 3  – Ithiel Horton (Delaware), Kai Toews (UNCW)
 Dec. 10 – Ithiel Horton (Delaware)(2)
 Dec. 17 – Camren Wynter (Drexel)(2)
 Dec. 24 – Kris Wooten (Elon)
 Dec. 31 – Chase Audige (William & Mary)(2)
 Jan. 7  – Kai Toews (UNCW)(2)
 Jan. 14 – Ithiel Horton (Delaware)(3)
 Jan. 21 – Camren Wynter (Drexel)(3)
 Jan. 28 – Kai Toews (UNCW)(3)
 Feb. 4  – Chase Audige (William & Mary)(3)
 Feb. 11 – Camren Wynter (Drexel)(4)
 Feb. 18 – Kai Toews (UNCW)(4)
 Feb. 25 – Camren Wynter (Drexel)(5)
 Mar.  4 – Ithiel Horton (Delaware)(4)

Postseason

CAA All-Conference Teams and Awards

Attendance

References